The Gawler railway line (also known as the Gawler Central railway line) is a suburban commuter railway line in the city of Adelaide, South Australia. It is the only rail route in Adelaide to have no interchange with another line at any station except Adelaide.

History

The line was opened in 1857 from Adelaide to Gawler, and extended to Kapunda in 1860. Branches were later built from Gawler to termini in Angaston, Truro, Morgan, Robertstown, Peterborough, Spalding and Gladstone. Between Adelaide and Salisbury, the two broad gauge lines are paralleled by one standard gauge line on the Adelaide to Port Augusta line. A little north of Salisbury the standard gauge line heads north-west, and from Salisbury to Gawler there are two broad gauge tracks, with a single broad gauge track north of Gawler.

South of Gawler, there were branches to the Holden factory at Elizabeth South, the Penfield railway line which serviced the former munitions factory and other Defence facilities in the area now called Edinburgh, and the Port Pirie line which also branched from the Gawler line at Salisbury railway station until it was converted to standard gauge with a new track laid alongside the broad gauge tracks. Prior to 1987, at Dry Creek, the Dry Creek-Port Adelaide railway line branched west, and the Northfield railway line used to branch east. In the mid 2000s, a new station was built at Mawson Lakes.

Renewal and electrification 
In 2008, the State Government announced a plan to rebuild the Gawler line in preparation for the line to be electrified with the Federal Government also to provide funding. This work saw the track removed, and the track bed, sleepers and track renewed. Dual gauge sleepers were laid to allow for the line to be converted to standard gauge at a future date. The line was closed between North Adelaide and Mawson Interchange for four months from June 2010 for this work to be performed, and between Mawson Interchange and Gawler Central station for seven months from September 2011. Following the withdrawal of Federal Government funding by the then newly elected Abbott Liberal-National government, the electrification was postponed in October 2013.

On 6 February 2011, a new Adelaide Metro railcar depot opened to the east of Dry Creek station to replace the facility behind the new Royal Adelaide Hospital site and Adelaide station. The depot is the major maintenance and re-fuelling facility for the diesel train fleet, with capacity to store 70 railcars with over 11 kilometres of track. The depot has been designed to allow future conversion to support electric rolling stock.

To facilitate work on the Torrens Rail Junction in 2017, the Gawler line between Adelaide and Mawson Lakes was closed from 1–15 October and 18 November to 5 December.

Following a decade of on-again, off-again talks, electrification of the Gawler line was announced in 2018. The announcement only promised Stage 1 electrification as far as Salisbury with works anticipated to commence in 2018, but a $220 million grant from the Federal Government also allowed for Stage 2 electrification for the remainder of the line to proceed. Works commenced in November 2019 with completion anticipated in 2021. Contrary to the Seaford line electrification which saw the line closed completely for 11 months, from October 2020 onward, main construction on the Gawler line is being spread out across a rolling schedule of partial and full line closures across 12 months; early works before October 2020 were spread across smaller closures typically at nights and on weekends.

The entire line was closed on 25 December 2020; it was intended to reopen in November 2021 but was delayed due to restrictions regarding the COVID-19 lockdown in July. The line was expected to reopen around 30 April 2022, but following the state election in March, the reopening was pushed back to the end of June.

The line was reopened on 12 June. Only three A-City 4000 class will run along the line to begin with; the 3000/3100 class will continue to serve the line until at least March 2023.

An overpass over the railway line next to Ovingham railway station is currently under construction, and is expected to be finished in 2023; the Torrens Road overpass will replace a level crossing. Ovingham station was partly demolished in March 2022, and will remain closed when the line reopens.

Route
The line runs from Adelaide station north via Prospect, Mawson Lakes, Salisbury, Elizabeth and Smithfield to the town Gawler on the outer northern metropolitan fringe. Like the rest of the Adelaide suburban passenger rail network, the line is  broad gauge for its entire length. The Australian Rail Track Corporation's standard gauge Adelaide to Port Augusta line runs parallel to the route from the Adelaide Gaol triangle to Salisbury, then turns north west towards Virginia.

Line guide

Services

Commuter 
All suburban rail passenger services are operated by Adelaide Metro. On 28 April 2008, new timetables were introduced on the Gawler line in an effort to boost efficiency. Shorter secondary services that terminated at Dry Creek and Salisbury were withdrawn, new limited express services were introduced, and a new Hi-Frequency station policy adopted. Nearly all services either start or terminate their journey at Gawler or Gawler Central stations, apart from a morning peak express service that commences its journey at Salisbury.

Under this policy, the Hi-Frequency stations (Islington, Mawson Interchange, Parafield, Salisbury, Elizabeth, Smithfield, Tambelin and Gawler) have services every 15 minutes, while all other stations have a 30-minute service. This is in addition to several peak hour express services that stop only at selected Hi-Frequency stations.

Weekend services operate with 30-minute frequency, and every second train runs express between Adelaide and Dry Creek using 3000 class railcars. Evening/Night services are hourly and stop at all stations with the exception of North Adelaide. Until April 2008, most services along the line were operated by 3000 class railcars. However, with the introduction of the new timetable, 2000 class railcars became more frequent, especially during peak hour. The 2000 class railcars were retired in August 2015.

Freight
Freight is still a major factor along this transport corridor, with the Australian Rail Track Corporation's standard gauge Adelaide to Port Augusta line running parallel to the broad gauge track between Adelaide and Salisbury. Since 1984, this line has been standard gauge and had no interface with the suburban lines. Bowmans Rail, One Rail Australia, Pacific National, SCT Logistics, and Journey Beyond operate services via the line, with the latter operating The Ghan and Indian Pacific passenger trains along this section. Until 2007, grain trains operated from Roseworthy to Port Adelaide. The last freight service on the Gawler line was the Penrice Stone Train which operated to Penrice until it ceased operating in June 2014.

References

External links 
 Gawler Central to City - Adelaide Metro website
 Gallery of track refurbishment work: Adelaide to Mawson Interchange 2010 Johnny's Pages
 Gallery of track refurbishment work: Mawson Lakes to Gawler 2011 Johnny's Pages
 Gallery of track refurbishment work: Mawson Lakes to Gawler 2011-2012  Johnny's Pages
 Gallery of track refurbishment work: Gawler to Gawler Central 2012  Johnny's Pages
 Gallery of electrification work: Adelaide to Gawler 2012 Johnny's Pages

Railway lines in South Australia
Railway lines opened in 1858
Transport in Adelaide